This was the first edition of the tournament.

Darya Astakhova and Andreea Roșca won the title, defeating Réka Luca Jani and Panna Udvardy in the final, 7–5, 5–7, [10–7].

Seeds

Draw

Draw

References

External Links
Main Draw

Iasi Open - Doubles